Pir Deh-e Shaft (also Romanized as Pīr Deh-e Shaft; also known as Pīr Deh) is a village in Jirdeh Rural District, in the Central District of Shaft County, Gilan Province, Iran. At the 2006 census, its population was 389, in 114 families.

References 

Populated places in Shaft County